The 2002 WNBA season was the sixth season for the Los Angeles Sparks. The Sparks ended the season winning the WNBA Finals for the second straight year.  As of 2012, this is the last WNBA team to win back to back championships.

Offseason

WNBA Draft

Regular season

Season standings

Season Schedule

Player stats

Awards and honors
Lisa Leslie, Best WNBA Player ESPY Award

References

Sparks on Basketball Reference

Los Angeles Sparks seasons
Los Angeles
Women's National Basketball Association championship seasons
Western Conference (WNBA) championship seasons
Los Angeles Sparks